Antonio Maison Azimonti (or Azzimonti) (2 January 1925 – 10 August 1997) was an Italian footballer He was born in Busto Arsizio.

He played for 8 seasons (211 games, 1 goal) in the Serie A for Aurora Pro Patria 1919, A.S. Roma and Udinese Calcio.

His older brother Carlo Azimonti also played football professionally. To distinguish them, Carlo was referred to as Azimonti I and Antonio as Azimonti II.

References

External links

1925 births
1997 deaths
Italian footballers
Serie A players
Aurora Pro Patria 1919 players
Genoa C.F.C. players
A.S. Roma players
Udinese Calcio players
Association football defenders